Markus Prock (born 22 June 1964) is an Austrian luger who competed between 1983 and 2002. Born in Innsbruck, Prock competed in six Winter Olympics winning three medals in the men's singles event with two silvers (1992, 1994) and one bronze (2002).

Prock grew up in the village of Mieders in the Stubaital. His parents managed a petrol station and a pension. He competed in several sports in his youth, ski racing, playing football and sprinting, achieving personal bests of 22.8s for the 200m and 50.9s for the 400m whilst in high school. He took up luge after racing in a competition for teenagers held at Igls.

Prock was known for his rivalry with Georg Hackl, with Prock being dominant in World Cup competition whilst Hackl consistently achieved success at the Winter Olympics. Prock was noted for his athleticism and his powerful start.

At the FIL World Luge Championships, Prock won 13 medals, including five gold (Men's singles: 1987, 1996; Mixed team: 1996, 1997, 1999), four silvers (Men's singles: 1990, 1997; Mixed team: 1991, 1993), and four bronzes (Men's singles: 1995, 2001; Mixed team: 1995, 2001).

Prock won ten medals at the FIL European Luge Championships with five in men's singles (gold: 1994, 1998, 2002; silver: 1988, 1990) and five medals in the mixed team event (silver: 1992, 1996; bronze: 1994, 1998, 2002).

He also won the overall Luge World Cup ten times in men's singles (198788, 199091, 199192, 199293, 199394, 199495, 199596, 199697, 199899, 200102).

After retiring from competition, Prock was appointed as sporting director of the Austrian Luge Federation in 2002. He left this role in November 2018, when he was elected as the Federation's president, receiving 88 percent of the vote in the Federation's national conference in Semmering, Austria.

He is the father of luger Hannah Prock. He also manages his nephew, Gregor Schlierenzauer, who was second in the 200607 Ski jumping World Cup entering the FIS Nordic World Ski Championships 2007 in Sapporo, Japan. Schlierenzauer won a gold in the team large hill at those championships.

References

1984 luge men's singles results
1988 luge men's singles results
1992 luge men's singles results
1994 luge men's singles results
1998 luge men's singles results
2002 luge men's singles results
2007 Luge World Championships interview.
FIL-Luge profile
Fuzilogik Sports - Winter Olympic results - Men's luge
Hickoksports.com results on Olympic champions in luge and skeleton.
Hickok sports information on World champions in luge and skeleton.
List of European luge champions 
List of men's singles luge World Cup champions since 1978.

External links
 
 
 

1964 births
Living people
Austrian male lugers
Sportspeople from Innsbruck
Lugers at the 1984 Winter Olympics
Lugers at the 1988 Winter Olympics
Lugers at the 1992 Winter Olympics
Lugers at the 1994 Winter Olympics
Lugers at the 1998 Winter Olympics
Lugers at the 2002 Winter Olympics
Olympic lugers of Austria
Olympic silver medalists for Austria
Olympic bronze medalists for Austria
Olympic medalists in luge
Medalists at the 2002 Winter Olympics
Medalists at the 1994 Winter Olympics
Medalists at the 1992 Winter Olympics
Recipients of the Decoration of Honour for Services to the Republic of Austria